Rob Font (born June 25, 1987) is an American professional mixed martial artist. He currently competes in the Bantamweight division in the Ultimate Fighting Championship (UFC). A professional competitor since 2011, Font formerly competed for CES MMA, where he was the Featherweight Champion. As of December 6, 2022, he is #6 in the UFC bantamweight rankings.

Mixed martial arts career

Early career
A native of Central Massachusetts, Font began training as an amateur in 2009 and compiled a record of 3-1 before making his professional debut in December 2011.

Font compiled a record of 10-1 as a professional, competing for several regional promotions across his native New England before signing with the UFC in the spring of 2014.

Ultimate Fighting Championship
Font made his promotional debut against George Roop on July 5, 2014 at UFC 175. He won the fight via knockout in the first round. He also earned a Performance of the Night bonus.

For his next bout, Font was expected to face Chris Beal on September 5, 2014 at UFC Fight Night 50. However, Font pulled out of the bout, citing an injury.

Font was expected to face Mitch Gagnon on October 4, 2014 at UFC Fight Night 54. Subsequently, Font pulled out of the fight the week of the event,  and he was replaced by Roman Salazar.

Font was expected to face Chris Williams on January 17, 2016 at UFC Fight Night 81. Subsequently, Williams was forced out of the fight due to an injury, and he was replaced by Joey Gomez. Font won the fight by TKO in the second round.

Font next faced John Lineker on May 14, 2016 at UFC 198. He lost the fight via unanimous decision.

Font was expected to face Ian Entwistle on October 8, 2016 at UFC 204. However, on the day prior to the event, Entwistle fell ill during the weight cutting process and the bout was scrapped.

Font was expected to face Alejandro Pérez on December 3, 2016 at The Ultimate Fighter 24 Finale. However, Perez pulled out of the fight on November 24.  He was replaced by promotional newcomer Matt Schnell. Font won the fight via TKO in the first round.

Font faced Douglas Silva de Andrade on July 8, 2017 at UFC 213. He won the fight by submission in the second round. He earned the Performance of the Night award for the win.

Font faced Pedro Munhoz on October 28, 2017 at UFC Fight Night 119. He lost the fight via submission in round one.

Font faced Thomas Almeida on January 20, 2018 at UFC 220. He won the fight via TKO in the second round.

Font faced Raphael Assunção on July 7, 2018 at UFC 226. He lost the fight via unanimous decision.

Font faced Sergio Pettis on December 15, 2018 at UFC on Fox 31. He won the fight via unanimous decision.

Font was expected to face Cody Stamann on June 22, 2019 at UFC Fight Night 154. However, on June 5, 2019, it was reported that Stamman pulled out of the event due to an injury, and he was replaced by John Lineker. In turn, Lineker was pulled from the bout for an undisclosed reason. Font, in turn, would be removed from the card.

Font faced Ricky Simón at UFC on ESPN 7 on December 7, 2019. He won the fight via unanimous decision. This fight earned him the Fight of the Night award. 

Font faced Marlon Moraes on December 19, 2020 at UFC Fight Night 183. Font won the fight via technical knockout in round one. This win earned him a Performance of the Night award.

Font faced Cody Garbrandt on May 22, 2021 at UFC Fight Night 188. He won the bout by unanimous decision.

Font faced former WEC and UFC featherweight champion José Aldo in the headliner of UFC on ESPN 31 on December 4, 2021. He lost the fight via unanimous decision.

Font faced Marlon Vera on April 30, 2022 at UFC on ESPN 35. At the weigh-ins, Font weighed in at 138.5 pounds, two and half pounds over the bantamweight non-title fight limit. The bout proceeded at a catchweight with Font forfeiting 20% of his purse to Vera. Despite significantly outstriking Vera, Font was dropped in three straight rounds and lost the fight via unanimous decision. The fight also earned the Fight of the Night award, although Font was deemed ineligible for a bonus due missing weight and his share went to Vera. Font set bantamweight records for significant and total strikes landed and attempted in a fight; It also had the second-most combined strikes landed of any UFC fight.

Font is scheduled to face Adrian Yanez on April 8, 2023 at UFC 287

Personal life 
Font is of Puerto Rican descent.

Championships and accomplishments
Ultimate Fighting Championship
Performance of the Night (Three times) 
Fight of the Night (Two times) 

CES MMA
Featherweight Championship (One time)

Mixed martial arts record

|-
|Loss
|align=center|19–6
|Marlon Vera
|Decision (unanimous)
|UFC on ESPN: Font vs. Vera
|
|align=center|5
|align=center|5:00
|Las Vegas, Nevada, United States
|
|-
|Loss
|align=center|19–5
|José Aldo
|Decision (unanimous)
|UFC on ESPN: Font vs. Aldo 
|
|align=center|5
|align=center|5:00
|Las Vegas, Nevada, United States
|
|-
|Win
|align=center|19–4
|Cody Garbrandt
|Decision (unanimous)
|UFC Fight Night: Font vs. Garbrandt
|
|align=center|5
|align=center|5:00
|Las Vegas, Nevada, United States
|
|-
|Win
|align=center|18–4
|Marlon Moraes
|TKO (punches)
|UFC Fight Night: Thompson vs. Neal
|
|align=center|1
|align=center|3:47
|Las Vegas, Nevada, United States
|
|-
|Win
|align=center|17–4
|Ricky Simón
|Decision (unanimous)
|UFC on ESPN: Overeem vs. Rozenstruik
|
|align=center|3
|align=center|5:00
|Washington, D.C., United States
|
|-
|Win
|align=center|16–4
|Sergio Pettis
|Decision (unanimous)
|UFC on Fox: Lee vs. Iaquinta 2
|
|align=center|3
|align=center|5:00
|Milwaukee, Wisconsin, United States
|
|-
|Loss
|align=center|15–4
|Raphael Assunção
|Decision (unanimous)
|UFC 226
|
|align=center|3
|align=center|5:00
|Las Vegas, Nevada, United States
|
|-
|Win
|align=center|15–3
|Thomas Almeida
|TKO (head kick and punches)
|UFC 220
|
|align=center|2
|align=center|2:24
|Boston, Massachusetts, United States
|
|-
|Loss
|align=center|14–3
|Pedro Munhoz
|Submission (guillotine choke)
|UFC Fight Night: Brunson vs. Machida
|
|align=center|1
|align=center|4:03
|São Paulo, Brazil
|
|-
|Win
|align=center|14–2
|Douglas Silva de Andrade
|Submission (guillotine choke)
|UFC 213
|
|align=center|2
|align=center|4:36
|Las Vegas, Nevada, United States
|
|-
|Win
|align=center|13–2
|Matt Schnell
|KO (knee and punches)
|The Ultimate Fighter: Tournament of Champions Finale
|
|align=center|1
|align=center|3:47
|Las Vegas, Nevada, United States
| 
|-
|Loss
|align=center|12–2
|John Lineker
|Decision (unanimous)
|UFC 198
|
|align=center|3
|align=center|5:00
|Curitiba, Brazil
|
|-
| Win
| align=center| 12–1
| Joey Gomez
| TKO (punches)
| UFC Fight Night: Dillashaw vs. Cruz
| 
| align=center| 2
| align=center| 4:13
| Boston, Massachusetts, United States
| 
|-
| Win
| align=center| 11–1
| George Roop
| KO (punches)
| UFC 175
| 
| align=center| 1
| align=center| 2:19
| Las Vegas, Nevada, United States
|
|-
| Win
| align=center| 10–1
| Tristen Johnson
| KO (punch)
| CES MMA 23
| 
| align=center| 1
| align=center| 2:48
| Lincoln, Rhode Island, United States
| 
|-
| Win
| align=center| 9–1
| Ahsan Abdullah
| Submission (D'Arce choke)
| CES MMA 21
| 
| align=center| 1
| align=center| 3:48
| Lincoln, Rhode Island, United States
| 
|-
| Win
| align=center| 8–1
| Matt Dimarcantonio
| Decision (unanimous)
| CES MMA 20
| 
| align=center| 3
| align=center| 5:00
| Lincoln, Rhode Island, United States
|
|-
| Win
| align=center| 7–1
| Chris Foster
| TKO (punches)
| CES MMA 18: Gold Rush
| 
| align=center| 1
| align=center| 4:01
| Lincoln, Rhode Island, United States
|
|-
| Win
| align=center| 6–1
| Lucas Cruz
| Decision (unanimous)
| CES MMA: Path to Destruction
| 
| align=center| 3
| align=center| 5:00
| Lincoln, Rhode Island, United States
|
|-
| Win
| align=center| 5–1
| Saul Almeida
| Decision (unanimous)
| CES MMA: Undisputed 2
| 
| align=center| 3
| align=center| 5:00
| Lincoln, Rhode Island, United States
| 
|-
| Win
| align=center| 4–1
| Brandon Fleming
| Decision (unanimous)
| Cage Titans 11
| 
| align=center| 3
| align=center| 5:00
| Plymouth, Massachusetts, United States
| 
|-
| Win
| align=center| 3–1
| Lionel Young
| Submission (guillotine choke)
| CFX 21
| 
| align=center| 3
| align=center| 0:58
| Brockton, Massachusetts, United States
| 
|-
| Win
| align=center| 2–1
| Thane Stimson
| KO (punch)
| Reality Fighting
| 
| align=center| 1
| align=center| 0:43
| Uncasville, Connecticut, United States
|
|-
| Loss
| align=center| 1–1
| Desmond Green
| Decision (unanimous)
| Premier FC 8
| 
| align=center| 3
| align=center| 5:00
| Holyoke, Massachusetts, United States
| 
|-
| Win
| align=center| 1–0
| Matt Tuthill
| Submission (armbar)
| Premier FC 7
| 
| align=center| 1
| align=center| 2:32
| Amherst, Massachusetts, United States
|

See also
 List of current UFC fighters
 List of male mixed martial artists

References

External links

1987 births
Living people
American male mixed martial artists
Bantamweight mixed martial artists
Mixed martial artists utilizing Muay Thai
Mixed martial artists utilizing Brazilian jiu-jitsu
Mixed martial artists from Massachusetts
Ultimate Fighting Championship male fighters
American practitioners of Brazilian jiu-jitsu
American Muay Thai practitioners
American sportspeople of Puerto Rican descent
Sportspeople from Middlesex County, Massachusetts
Sportspeople from Worcester County, Massachusetts
People from Leominster, Massachusetts
People from North Reading, Massachusetts